Abbe may refer to:

People
 Abbe (name)

Places
 Abbe (crater), a lunar impact crater that is located in the southern hemisphere on the far side of the Moon
 Lake Abbe, African lake
 Abbe Falls, waterfalls in India

Other uses
 Abbé, the French word for abbot
 Abbe condenser, a component of a microscope
 Abbe lip switch, a method of lip reconstruction
 Abbe number, a measure of the material's optical dispersion
 Abbe prism, a type of constant deviation dispersive prism similar to a Pellin–Broca prism
 Abbe refractometer, a bench-top refractometer that offers the highest precision of the different types of refractometers
 Abbe sine condition, a condition that must be fulfilled by a lens or other optical system in order for it to produce sharp images of off-axis as well as on-axis objects
 Abbe Creek School, historical school house in Iowa

See also
 L'Abbé (disambiguation)